Onthophagus hystrix, is a species of dung beetle found in India, and Sri Lanka.

Description
This minute broadly oval, less convex species has an average length of about 3.5 to 5 mm. Body Reddish brown in color with a shine. Antennae yellowish, and body covered with long erect pale hairs dorsally and ventrally. Head large, less dilated laterally before the large eyes. Clypeus coarsely and rugosely punctured. There is a pair of minute transversely placed tubercles between the eyes. Pronotum closely and moderately finely punctured. Elytra finely striate, with flat intervals and minute punctures. Pygidium strongly and rugosely punctured.

References 

Scarabaeinae
Insects of India
Beetles of Sri Lanka
Insects described in 1914